Giuseppe Gabelli (born 1958) is a former Italian paralympic archer who won a four medals at the Summer Paralympics.

He competed in four edition of Summer Paralympics and won a medal in every single edition.

References

External links
 
 All-Time Paralympic Summer Games Multi-Medallists

1958 births
Living people
Paralympic archers of Italy
Paralympic gold medalists for Italy
Paralympic silver medalists for Italy
Paralympic medalists in archery
Archers at the 1988 Summer Paralympics
Archers at the 1992 Summer Paralympics
Archers at the 1996 Summer Paralympics
Archers at the 2000 Summer Paralympics
Medalists at the 1988 Summer Paralympics
Medalists at the 1992 Summer Paralympics
Medalists at the 1996 Summer Paralympics
Medalists at the 2000 Summer Paralympics
Sportspeople from Parma
20th-century Italian people